The fourth season of the Fairy Tail anime series was directed by Shinji Ishihira and produced by A-1 Pictures and Satelight. Like the rest of the series, it follows the adventures of Natsu Dragneel and Lucy Heartfilia of the fictional guild Fairy Tail. It continues the  story arc from the third season, where Fairy Tail's S-Class examination on Sirius Island is interrupted by the arrival of Grimoire Heart, who attempt to retrieve the dark wizard Zeref living on the island.

The season initially ran from October 15, 2011 to April 7, 2012 on TV Tokyo in Japan. Seven DVD compilations were released, each containing four episodes, by Pony Canyon between March 7 and September 5, 2012.  The season was licensed for a dubbed broadcast in English by Animax Asia, which released it as part of "Season 3". Funimation Entertainment released the episodes with their own English-dubbed version across three Blu-ray/DVD box sets, released on March 25, May 20, and July 15 in 2014 along with the first six episodes of season 5. The episodes were made available on Funimation's website as "Season 4".

The season makes use of 6 pieces of theme music: three opening themes and three ending themes. The opening themes are  performed by Daisy x Daisy until episode 111, "I Wish" performed by Milky Bunny until episode 124, and  performed by +Plus for the rest of the season.


Episode list

Notes

References

General

Specific

4
2011 Japanese television seasons
2012 Japanese television seasons